Appetite for Democracy was a series of concerts by hard rock band Guns N' Roses celebrating 25 years of Appetite for Destruction, and four years for their studio album Chinese Democracy. It started with a 12-night residency in Las Vegas. Their previous tour, Up Close and Personal, had ended in Spain on July 22, 2012. Former bassist Duff McKagan filled in for Tommy Stinson for several shows, Stinson had previous commitments to The Replacements. The tour ended with another residency in Vegas, titled "No Trickery! An Evening of Destruction!". The title of the show "No Trickery" was a play on jokes Axl Rose had made about Red Hot Chili Peppers being forced to pantomime their performance at the Super Bowl XLVIII halftime show.

Tour dates

Festivals and other miscellaneous performances
This concert was a part of "Tommy Hilfiger's Secret Party"
This concert was a part of "2013 Malaysian Grand Prix After Party"
This concert was a part of the "Rocklahoma"
This concert was a part of the "River City Rock Fest"
This concert was a part of the "Governors Ball Music Festival"
This concert was part of the Revolver Golden Gods awards.
This concert was a part of "Rock on the Range"
This concert was recorded in 3D, and released on Blu-Ray in 2014.

Cancellations and rescheduled shows

Box office score data

Setlists

2012 setlists

{{hidden
| headercss = background: #ccccff; font-size: 100%; width: 100%;
| contentcss = text-align: left; font-size: 100%; width: 100%;
| header = October 31
| content =
"Chinese Democracy"
"Welcome to the Jungle"
"It's So Easy"
"Mr. Brownstone"
"Estranged"
"Better"
"Live and Let Die"
"This I Love"
"Rocket Queen"
"Motivation"
"Street of Dreams"
"You Could Be Mine"
"Sweet Child O' Mine"
"Another Brick in the Wall Part 2"
"November Rain"
"Glad to Be Here"
"Don't Cry"
"Don't Let It Bring You Down"
"Civil War"
"Knockin' on Heaven's Door"
"Nightrain"
Encore
"Madagascar"
"Patience"
"Paradise City"
}}

{{hidden
| headercss = background: #ccccff; font-size: 100%; width: 100%;
| contentcss = text-align: left; font-size: 100%; width: 100%;
| header = November 2
| content =
"Chinese Democracy"
"Welcome to the Jungle"
"It's So Easy"
"Mr. Brownstone"
"Estranged"
"Rocket Queen"
"Live and Let Die"
"This I Love"
"Better"
"Motivation"
"Street of Dreams"
"You Could Be Mine"
"Sweet Child O' Mine"
"Another Brick in the Wall Part 2"
"November Rain"
"Glad to Be Here"
"Don't Cry"
"Used to Love Her"
"Don't Let It Bring You Down"
"Out Ta Get Me"
"Civil War"
"Riff Raff"
"Knockin' on Heaven's Door"
"Nightrain"
Encore
"Madagascar"
"Patience"
"Paradise City"
}}

{{hidden
| headercss = background: #ccccff; font-size: 100%; width: 100%;
| contentcss = text-align: left; font-size: 100%; width: 100%;
| header = November 3
| content =
"Chinese Democracy"
"Welcome to the Jungle"
"It's So Easy"
"Mr. Brownstone"
"Estranged"
"Rocket Queen"
"Live and Let Die"
"This I Love"
"Motivation"
"Street of Dreams"
"You Could Be Mine"
"Sweet Child O' Mine"
"Another Brick in the Wall Part 2"
"November Rain"
"Glad to Be Here"
"Don't Cry"
"Shackler's Revenge"
"Used to Love Her"
"Don't Let It Bring You Down"
"Civil War"
"Knockin' on Heaven's Door"
"Nightrain"
Encore
"Madagascar"
"Better"
"Patience"
"Paradise City"
}}

{{hidden
| headercss = background: #ccccff; font-size: 100%; width: 100%;
| contentcss = text-align: left; font-size: 100%; width: 100%;
| header = November 7
| content =
"Chinese Democracy"
"Welcome to the Jungle"
"It's So Easy"
"Mr. Brownstone"
"Estranged"
"Rocket Queen"
"Live and Let Die"
"This I Love"
"Better"
"Motivation"
"Catcher in the Rye"
"Street of Dreams"
"You Could Be Mine"
"Sweet Child O' Mine"
"Another Brick in the Wall Part 2"
"November Rain"
"Glad to Be Here"
"Don't Cry"
"The Seeker"
"Used to Love Her"
"Don't Let It Bring You Down"
"Civil War"
"Knockin' on Heaven's Door"
"Nightrain"
Encore
"Madagascar"
"There Was a Time"
"Patience"
"Paradise City"
}}

{{hidden
| headercss = background: #ccccff; font-size: 100%; width: 100%;
| contentcss = text-align: left; font-size: 100%; width: 100%;
| header = November 9
| content =
"Chinese Democracy"
"Welcome to the Jungle"
"It's So Easy"
"Mr. Brownstone"
"Estranged"
"Rocket Queen"
"Live and Let Die"
"This I Love"
"Motivation"
"Catcher in the Rye"
"Street of Dreams"
"You Could Be Mine"
"Sweet Child O' Mine"
"Another Brick in the Wall Part 2"
"November Rain"
"Glad to Be Here"
"Don't Cry"
"The Seeker"
"Don't Let It Bring You Down"
"Civil War"
"Better"
"Knockin' on Heaven's Door"
"Nightrain"
Encore
"Madagascar"
"Used to Love Her"
"There Was a Time"
"Patience"
"Paradise City"
}}

{{hidden
| headercss = background: #ccccff; font-size: 100%; width: 100%;
| contentcss = text-align: left; font-size: 100%; width: 100%;
| header = November 10
| content =
"Chinese Democracy"
"Welcome to the Jungle"
"It's So Easy"
"Mr. Brownstone"
"Estranged"
"Rocket Queen"
"Live and Let Die"
"This I Love"
"Better"
"Motivation"
"Catcher in the Rye"
"Street of Dreams"
"You Could Be Mine"
"Sweet Child O' Mine"
"Another Brick in the Wall Part 2"
"November Rain"
"Glad to Be Here"
"Don't Cry"
"The Seeker"
"Used to Love Her"
"Don't Let It Bring You Down"
"Civil War"
"Knockin' on Heaven's Door"
"Nightrain"
Encore
"Madagascar"
"There Was a Time"
"Whole Lotta Rosie"
"Patience"
"Paradise City"
}}

{{hidden
| headercss = background: #ccccff; font-size: 100%; width: 100%;
| contentcss = text-align: left; font-size: 100%; width: 100%;
| header = November 14
| content =
"Chinese Democracy"
"Welcome to the Jungle"
"It's So Easy"
"Mr. Brownstone"
"Estranged"
"Rocket Queen"
"Live and Let Die"
"This I Love"
"Better"
"Motivation"
"Catcher in the Rye"
"Street of Dreams"
"You Could Be Mine"
"Sweet Child O' Mine"
"Another Brick in the Wall Part 2"
"November Rain"
"Objectify"
"Don't Cry"
"Civil War"
"Knockin' on Heaven's Door"
"Nightrain"
Encore
"Don't Let It Bring You Down"
"The Seeker"
"There Was a Time"
"Patience"
"Paradise City"
}}

{{hidden
| headercss = background: #ccccff; font-size: 100%; width: 100%;
| contentcss = text-align: left; font-size: 100%; width: 100%;
| header = November 17
| content =
"Chinese Democracy"
"Welcome to the Jungle"
"It's So Easy"
"Mr. Brownstone"
"Estranged"
"Rocket Queen"
"Live and Let Die"
"This I Love"
"Better"
"Motivation"
"Catcher in the Rye"
"Street of Dreams"
"You Could Be Mine"
"Sweet Child O' Mine"
"Another Brick in the Wall Part 2"
"November Rain"
"Objectify"
"Don't Cry"
"The Seeker"
"Civil War"
"Knockin' on Heaven's Door"
"Nightrain"
Encore
"Don't Let It Bring You Down"
"Whole Lotta Rosie"
"Patience"
"Paradise City"
}}

{{hidden
| headercss = background: #ccccff; font-size: 100%; width: 100%;
| contentcss = text-align: left; font-size: 100%; width: 100%;
| header = November 18
| content =
"Chinese Democracy"
"Welcome to the Jungle"
"It's So Easy"
"Mr. Brownstone"
"Estranged"
"Rocket Queen"
"Live and Let Die"
"This I Love"
"Better"
"Motivation"
"Catcher in the Rye"
"Street of Dreams"
"You Could Be Mine"
"Sweet Child O' Mine"
"Another Brick in the Wall Part 2"
"November Rain"
"Glad to Be Here"
"Don't Cry"
"The Seeker"
"Civil War"
"Knockin' on Heaven's Door"
"Nightrain"
Encore
"Don't Let It Bring You Down"
"There Was a Time"
"Patience"
"Paradise City"
}}

{{hidden
| headercss = background: #ccccff; font-size: 100%; width: 100%;
| contentcss = text-align: left; font-size: 100%; width: 100%;
| header = November 21
| content =
"Chinese Democracy"
"Welcome to the Jungle"
"It's So Easy"
"Mr. Brownstone"
"Estranged"
"Rocket Queen"
"Live and Let Die"
"This I Love"
"Better"
"Motivation"
"Catcher in the Rye"
"Street of Dreams"
"You Could Be Mine"
"Sweet Child O' Mine"
"Another Brick in the Wall Part 2"
"November Rain"
"Objectify"
"Don't Cry"
"Civil War"
"The Seeker"
"Knockin' on Heaven's Door"
"Nightrain"
Encore
"Don't Let It Bring You Down"
"Used to Love Her"
"Patience"
"Paradise City"
}}

{{hidden
| headercss = background: #ccccff; font-size: 100%; width: 100%;
| contentcss = text-align: left; font-size: 100%; width: 100%;
| header = November 23
| content =
"Chinese Democracy"
"Welcome to the Jungle"
"It's So Easy"
"Mr. Brownstone"
"Estranged"
"Rocket Queen"
"Better"
"Live and Let Die"
"This I Love"
"Motivation"
"Catcher in the Rye"
"Street of Dreams"
"14 Years"
"You Could Be Mine"
"Sweet Child O' Mine"
"Another Brick in the Wall Part 2"
"November Rain"
"Glad to Be Here"
"Don't Cry"
"The Seeker"
"Civil War"
"Knockin' on Heaven's Door"
"Nightrain"
Encore
"Don't Let It Bring You Down"
"Used to Love Her"
"Dead Flowers"
"Patience"
"Paradise City"
}}

{{hidden
| headercss = background: #ccccff; font-size: 100%; width: 100%;
| contentcss = text-align: left; font-size: 100%; width: 100%;
| header = November 24
| content =
"Chinese Democracy"
"Welcome to the Jungle"
"It's So Easy"
"Mr. Brownstone"
"Estranged"
"Rocket Queen"
"Live and Let Die"
"This I Love"
"Better"
"Motivation"
"Catcher in the Rye"
"Street of Dreams"
"You Could Be Mine"
"14 Years"
"Sweet Child O' Mine"
"Another Brick in the Wall Part 2"
"November Rain"
"Objectify"
"Don't Cry"
"Whole Lotta Rosie"
"Civil War"
"Used to Love Her"
"Knockin' on Heaven's Door"
"Nightrain"
Encore
"Don't Let It Bring You Down"
"The Seeker"
"Patience"
"Paradise City"
}}

{{hidden
| headercss = background: #ccccff; font-size: 100%; width: 100%;
| contentcss = text-align: left; font-size: 100%; width: 100%;
| header = December 7
| content =
"Chinese Democracy"
"Welcome to the Jungle"
"It's So Easy"
"Mr. Brownstone"
"Estranged"
"Rocket Queen"
"Live and Let Die"
"This I Love"
"Better"
"Motivation"
"Catcher in the Rye"
"Street of Dreams"
"There Was a Time"
"You Could Be Mine"
"Sweet Child O' Mine"
"Another Brick in the Wall Part 2"
"November Rain"
"Objectify"
"Don't Cry"
"The Seeker"
"Civil War"
"Knockin' on Heaven's Door"
"Nightrain"
Encore
"Don't Let It Bring You Down"
"Patience"
"Paradise City"
}}

{{hidden
| headercss = background: #ccccff; font-size: 100%; width: 100%;
| contentcss = text-align: left; font-size: 100%; width: 100%;
| header = December 9
| content =
"Chinese Democracy"
"Welcome to the Jungle"
"It's So Easy"
"Mr. Brownstone"
"Estranged"
"Rocket Queen"
"Live and Let Die"
"This I Love"
"Motivation"
"Catcher in the Rye"
"Street of Dreams"
"Better"
"You Could Be Mine"
"Sweet Child O' Mine"
"Another Brick in the Wall Part 2"
"November Rain"
"Objectify"
"Don't Cry"
"Civil War"
"The Seeker"
"Knockin' on Heaven's Door"
"Nightrain"
Encore
"Madagascar"
"Nice Boys"
"Patience"
"Paradise City"
}}

{{hidden
| headercss = background: #ccccff; font-size: 100%; width: 100%;
| contentcss = text-align: left; font-size: 100%; width: 100%;
| header = December 12
| content =
"Chinese Democracy"
"Welcome to the Jungle"
"It's So Easy"
"Mr. Brownstone"
"Estranged"
"Rocket Queen"
"Better"
"Live and Let Die"
"This I Love"
"Riff Raff"
"Motivation"
"Catcher in the Rye"
"Street of Dreams"
"You Could Be Mine"
"Sweet Child O' Mine"
"Another Brick in the Wall Part 2"
"November Rain"
"Objectify"
"Don't Cry"
"The Seeker"
"Civil War"
"Knockin' on Heaven's Door"
"Nightrain"
Encore
"Don't Let It Bring You Down"
"Patience"
"Paradise City"
"Nice Boys"
}}

{{hidden
| headercss = background: #ccccff; font-size: 100%; width: 100%;
| contentcss = text-align: left; font-size: 100%; width: 100%;
| header = December 16
| content =
"Chinese Democracy"
"Welcome to the Jungle"
"It's So Easy"
"Mr. Brownstone"
"Estranged"
"Rocket Queen"
"Live and Let Die"
"This I Love"
"Better"
"Motivation"
"Catcher in the Rye"
"Street of Dreams"
"You Could Be Mine"
"Sweet Child O' Mine"
"Another Brick in the Wall Part 2"
"November Rain"
"Objectify"
"Don't Cry"
"The Seeker"
"Civil War"
"Knockin' on Heaven's Door"
"Nightrain"
Encore
"Patience"
"Paradise City"
}}

{{hidden
| headercss = background: #ccccff; font-size: 100%; width: 100%;
| contentcss = text-align: left; font-size: 100%; width: 100%;
| header = December 18
| content =
"Chinese Democracy"
"Welcome to the Jungle"
"It's So Easy"
"Mr. Brownstone"
"Estranged"
"Better"
"Rocket Queen"
"Live and Let Die"
"This I Love"
"Used to Love Her"
"Motivation"
"Catcher in the Rye"
"Street of Dreams"
"You Could Be Mine"
"Sweet Child O' Mine"
"Another Brick in the Wall Part 2"
"November Rain"
"Objectify"
"Don't Cry"
"The Seeker"
"Civil War"
"Knockin' on Heaven's Door"
"Nightrain"
Encore
"Don't Let It Bring You Down"
"Madagascar"
"Whole Lotta Rosie"
"Patience"
"Paradise City"
}}

2013 setlists

{{hidden
| headercss = background: #D8BFD8; font-size: 100%; width: 100%;
| contentcss = text-align: left; font-size: 100%; width: 100%;
| header = February 13
| content =
Acoustic Set
"You're Crazy"
"Used to Love Her"
"Welcome to the Jungle"
"Better"
"Sweet Child O' Mine"
"Patience"
"Don't Let It Bring You Down"
"Paradise City"
Encore
"Knockin' On Heaven's Door"
}}

2014 setlists

Personnel
Guns N' Roses
Axl Rose – lead vocals, piano, tambourine
Dizzy Reed – keyboards, piano, conga, shaker, backing vocals
Tommy Stinson – bass, backing vocals
DJ Ashba – lead and rhythm guitar, backing vocals
Ron "Bumblefoot" Thal – lead and rhythm guitar, backing vocals
Richard Fortus – lead and rhythm guitar, backing vocals
Chris Pitman – keyboards, samples, tambourine, backing vocals
Frank Ferrer – drums, percussion
Additional musician
Duff McKagan – bass, backing vocals, lead vocals on "Attitude" and "Raw Power"

References

Guns N' Roses concert tours
2012 concert tours
2013 concert tours
2014 concert tours